The Communauté de communes Les Sources de l'Yerres is a former federation of municipalities (communauté de communes) in the Seine-et-Marne département and in the Île-de-France région of France. It was created in December 2003. It was merged into the new Communauté de communes du Val Briard in January 2017.

Composition 
The Communauté de communes comprised the following communes:

Bernay-Vilbert
La Chapelle-Iger
Courpalay
Lumigny-Nesles-Ormeaux
Pécy
Le Plessis-Feu-Aussoux
Rozay-en-Brie
Vaudoy-en-Brie
Voinsles

See also
Communes of the Seine-et-Marne department

References 

Former commune communities of Seine-et-Marne